Bella Mikhaylovna Davidovich (Бэлла Миха́йловна Давидо́вич; born July 16, 1928) is a Soviet-born American pianist.

Biography
Davidovich was born in Baku, Azerbaijan SSR, into a Jewish family of musicians and began studying piano when she was six. Three years later, she was the soloist for a performance of Beethoven's Piano Concerto No. 1. In 1939, she moved to Moscow to continue her musical education. At the age of 18 she entered the Moscow Conservatory where she studied with Konstantin Igumnov and Yakov Flier. In 1949, she shared the first prize with Halina Czerny-Stefańska at the IV International Chopin Piano Competition.  This launched her on a career in the Soviet Union and Eastern Europe, in which she appeared with every major Russian conductor and performed as a soloist with the Leningrad Philharmonic Orchestra for 28 consecutive seasons.  She also taught at the Moscow Conservatory for sixteen years.  She was married to violinist Julian Sitkovetsky. Their son, Dmitry Sitkovetsky, is a violinist and conductor.

In 1978 she emigrated to the United States, where she became a naturalized citizen. She has taught at the Juilliard School in New York City since 1982. With the spirit of perestroika, she became the first Soviet émigré musician to receive an official invitation from the Soviet agency Goskoncert to perform in her native country. She played concertos, a recital with her son Dmitry Sitkovetsky playing the violin, and chamber music with the Borodin String Quartet to sold-out halls.

References

External links
Biography at her agent's page
 Interview with Vafa Mastanova, including short biography

1928 births
Living people
Soviet classical pianists
20th-century classical pianists
American classical pianists
Soviet emigrants to the United States
Jewish American musicians
Jewish classical pianists
International Chopin Piano Competition winners
Moscow Conservatory alumni
Musicians from Baku
American people of Azerbaijani-Jewish descent
Azerbaijani Jews
Soviet Jews
20th-century American pianists
American women classical pianists
20th-century American women pianists
21st-century classical pianists
21st-century American women pianists
21st-century American pianists